The 1993 All-Ireland Senior Camogie Championship was the high point of the 1993 season. The championship was won by Cork who defeated Galway by a ten-point margin in the final. The match drew an attendance of 5,400.

Semi-finals
Colette O'Mahony scored 3–5 as Cork beat Kilkenny in a high scoring and exciting semi-final, and substitute and Lynn Dunlea snatched an unlikely winning goal when completely surrounded by Kilkenny defenders to see Cork go through by a point, 5–10 to 2–18. Galway qualified for their first All-Ireland final since 1962 when they defeated Wexford in another high-scoring semi-final at Duggan Park.

Final
Lynn Dunlea scored three goals in Cork's victory in the final. Croke Park resembled a building site as Cork won their second successive All Ireland. Desmond Fahy wrote in the Irish Times. : 
The real difference between the sides was Cork’s deep well of experience. When the game hovered invitingly for both teams in the first five minutes of the second half, they were the side that were able to grasp it.

Final stages

 
MATCH RULES
50 minutes
Replay if scores level
Maximum of 3 substitutions

See also

 Wikipedia List of Camogie players
 National Camogie League
 Camogie All Stars Awards

References

External links
 Camogie Association
 All-Ireland Senior Camogie Championship: Roll of Honour
 Camogie on facebook
 Camogie on GAA Oral History Project

1993 in camogie
1993